Leland A. Bryant (1890–1954) was an architect who primarily worked in the Los Angeles area. Bryant had a short career as an architect that was ended by the Great Depression, but constructed many large Châteauesque apartment buildings, popular among many celebrities including Marilyn Monroe and John Wayne

Biography 
Born in Santa Cruz, Bryant received his architectural training from UC Berkeley.

Works 
While Bryant is noted for working in all architectural styles, he focused on the French chateau architecture. One of his earliest designs includes the Afton Arms Apartments in Hollywood, CA constructed in 1924. It is currently listed on the National Register of Historic Places. The Sunset Tower (1929–1932) located on 8358 Sunset Blvd. is another notable Bryant-design building. This landmark is an example of large scale Art Deco architectural design in Los Angeles. He also designed the Trianon Apartments, a French Normandy building located in Thai Town. The six-story structure, which features a round, conically roofed tower and steep-hipped slate roof, was designated Historic Cultural Monument No. 616. Other works include the Chateau La Fontaine (1929) located on 1287 N. Crescent Heights Blvd, Voltaire Building, Fontenoy, Moderne Sun Towers and Romanesque Villa Apartments.

References

External links 
 Los Angeles cultural resources

20th-century American architects
1890 births
1966 deaths